Sergey Anatolyevich Komarov (born 9 December 1983) is a former Russian alpine skier who competed in the 2002 Winter Olympics.

Senior coach of the Russian women's national team in alpine skiing.

References

External links
 sports-reference.com

1983 births
Living people
Russian male alpine skiers
Olympic alpine skiers of Russia
Alpine skiers at the 2002 Winter Olympics